This article lists plays and musicals set in New York City.

Anna Christie (1921)
The Hairy Ape (1922)
Street Scene (1929)
London Calling (1930)
Design for Living (1933)
Night of January 16th (1935)
The Old Maid (1935)
My Sister Eileen (1940)
Arsenic and Old Lace (1941)
On the Town (1944)
The Iceman Cometh (1946)
Death of a Salesman (1949)
Bell, Book and Candle (1950)
Guys and Dolls (1950)
The Seven Year Itch (1952)
Wonderful Town (1953)
Saturday Night (1954)
A View from the Bridge (1955)
Auntie Mame (1956)
West Side Story (1957)
Two for the Seesaw (1958)
The Zoo Story (1958)
Fiorello! (1959)
Do Re Mi (1960)
Come Blow Your Horn (1961)
Subways Are for Sleeping (1961)
How to Succeed in Business Without Really Trying (1961) 
A Thousand Clowns (1962)
Barefoot in the Park (1963)
Enter Laughing (1963)
Here's Love (1963)
Funny Girl (1964)
Hello, Dolly! (1964)
The Subject Was Roses (1964)
Balm in Gilead (1965)
Cactus Flower (1965)
The Odd Couple (1965)
Skyscraper (1965)
Mame (1966)
Sweet Charity (1966)
Wait Until Dark (1966)
How Now, Dow Jones (1967)
Love in E-Flat (1967)
The Boys in the Band (1968)
Hair (1968)
Plaza Suite (1968)
Promises, Promises (1968)
Play It Again, Sam (1969)
Applause (1970)
Company (1970)
Follies (1971)
The Prisoner of Second Avenue (1971)
The Sunshine Boys (1972)
Seesaw (1973)
A Chorus Line (1975)
Checking Out (1976)
Annie (1977)
Chapter Two (1977)
42nd Street (1980) 
Little Shop of Horrors  (1982) 
Strawhead (1982)
Mama, I Want to Sing! (1983)
Brighton Beach Memoirs (1983)
Falsettos (1992)
My Favorite Year (1992)
The Goodbye Girl (1993)
Rent (1996)
The Life (1997)
Ragtime (1998)
The Capeman (1998)
Bright Lights, Big City (1999)
Saturday Night Fever (1999)
The Wild Party (2000)
The Wild Party (2000)
The Last Five Years (2001)
The Producers (2001)
Thoroughly Modern Millie (2002)
Avenue Q (2003)
Doubt (2005)
[title of show] (musical) (2008)
In the Heights (2008)
The Addams Family (2009)
 Elf (2010)
Love Never Dies (2010)
Ordinary Days (2010)
Newsies (2012)
If/Then (2014)
The Lightning Thief (2014)
Hamilton (2015)
A Bronx Tale (2016)

New York